Pseudoziidae is a family of crustaceans belonging to superfamily Pseudozioidea in the order Decapoda.

Genera

The genus contains two extant and three extinct genera:

 Archaeozius Schweitzer, 2003
 Euryozius Miers, 1886
 Pseudozius Dana, 1851
 Santeexanthus Blow & Manning, 1996
 Tongapapaka Feldmann, Schweitzer & McLaughlin, 2006

References

Decapods
Decapod families